The Hongdu Yakovlev CJ-7 (L-7) is a two-seat piston engined trainer aircraft jointly developed by the Hongdu Aviation Industry Group and the Yakovlev, primarily for the Chinese People's Liberation Army Air Force (PLAAF).

Design and development
The CJ-7 is a Hongdu/Yakovlev jointly developed, single-engine, two-seat, propeller-driven, trainer aircraft. Hongdu Aviation Industry Group is an aircraft manufacturer that is part of the Aviation Industry Corporation of China (AVIC). The aircraft is intended to be the sole primary trainer used by Chinese aviation schools. The CJ-7 is capable of basic flight training and surveillance missions. The CJ-7 trainer is expected to replace large numbers of Nanchang CJ-6 trainers in the People's Liberation Army Air Force.

The CJ-7 project started in 2006. At the end of 2010, the CJ-7 made its first flight. It is expected PLAAF will purchase 300–500 CJ-7s.

Specifications (CJ-7)

See also

Notes

External links
Hongdu Aviation Industry Group
CJ-7 L10 trainer photos and development review, Chinese language

2010s Chinese military trainer aircraft
Hongdu aircraft